Igor Borisovich Ksenofontov (19 January 1939 – 13 June 1999) was a Soviet and Russian figure skating coach, founder of the Yekaterinburg figure skating school, president of the Sverdlovsk Figure Skating Federation. He was considered to be one of the best Soviet coaches.

Career 
Ksenofontov was born in Sverdlovsk in the family of  metallurgical engineer  Boris  Maksimovich Ksenofontov,  professor at  the Ural State  Technical  University,  and Galina Seregina, professor  at the Ural State Mining University.   He  had a younger sister Tatyana. Although his parents didn't consider it a serious occupation, he liked  sport from the very  young age and took part in regional  competitions in volleyball, swimming, figure skating. As a member of Sverdlovsk  figure skating team, he was coached by Evgeny Kuzminykh.

After  he graduated from school Ksenofontov spend a year working in metallurgy, which he later remembered as a job for "strong men", but monotonous. In 1958 he moved to Omsk and entered  the  Siberian Academy of Physical Culture, after graduation in 1962 taught at the Faculty of Cycle Sport and Speed Skating. Since 1963 he had been working as a figure skating judge. In 1964 he returned to Sverdlovsk and started  teaching at the Faculty  of Physical Education and Sport (Ural State Technical University).

He founded the first figure skating  school for children in Sverdlovsk, opened on March 1, 1969. Ksenofontov became a headmaster. Among the coaches were Agnessa Dunayeva, Nelya Dronova, Valery Dolgov, Anatoly Mikhalev, Leonid Rakultsev and others. They helped to create a unique  system of skaters' selection and training. In the 1970s sportsmen from Ksenofontov's school started to show noticeable results at the international competitions (particularly in pair skating, later in ladies' single skating). By the 1980s his school was widely known in the USSR. In 1981 the USSR Sport Committee ordered Ksenofontov's school to create a group to train specifically for the national team. Ksenofontov  left the headmaster's position to coach this group, and moved to Pervouralsk, which had a better ice rink.

Since 1990 he coached many figure skaters and coaches from China, the Israel Olympic team at the 1994 Winter Olympics; national team of Uzbekistan in 1993—1999.

Ksenofontov died from a heart failure in a train on his way to Bulgaria, in Kazan.

Personal life 
In 1975 Ksenofontov met his wife Galina Abramycheva (Sizova), an architect. Their son Alexey was born in 1979.

He was also known for culinary skills; his mastery in  sharpening and fixing figure skate blades; the ability to recognize the skaters's potential almost instantly; and for long-term close friendship with other coaches including Igor Moskvin, Edouard Pliner, Viktor Kudryavtsev, Vladislav Petukhov, Valentin Nikolaev, Galina Zmievskaya, Mikhail Drey, and Vladimir Kaprov.

Orders and medals 
 Order of the Badge of Honour (1971)
 Merited Coaches of the RSFSR (1974)
 Medal "Veteran of Labour" (1988)

References

1939 births
1999 deaths
Figure skating judges
Russian figure skating coaches
Soviet figure skating coaches
Merited Coaches of the Soviet Union
Sportspeople from Yekaterinburg